The 1983 NCAA Division I softball season, play of college softball in the United States organized by the National Collegiate Athletic Association (NCAA) at the Division I level, began in February 1983.  The season progressed through the regular season, many conference tournaments and championship series, and concluded with the 1983 NCAA Division I softball tournament and 1983 Women's College World Series.  The Women's College World Series, consisting of the eight remaining teams in the NCAA Tournament and held in Omaha, Nebraska at Seymour Smith Park, ended on May 29, 1983.

Conference standings

Women's College World Series
The 1983 NCAA Women's College World Series took place from May 25 to May 29, 1983 in Omaha, Nebraska.

Season leaders
Batting
Batting average: .516 – Mitzi Davis, East Carolina Pirates
RBIs: 46 – Mitzi Davis, East Carolina Pirates
Home runs: 9 – Cindy Mosteller, Baylor Lady Bears

Pitching
Wins: 30-7 – Lori Stoll, Texas A&M Aggies
ERA: 0.04 (1 ER/168.0 IP) – Tracy Compton, UCLA Bruins
Strikeouts: 340 – Lori Stoll, Texas A&M Aggies

Records
NCAA Division I season ERA:
0.04 (1 ER/168.0 IP) – Tracy Compton, UCLA Bruins

NCAA Division I single game assists:
12 – Wende Ward, Fresno State Bulldogs; February 23, 1983

Freshman class ERA:
0.09 (3 ER/219.0 IP) – Darlene Lowery,  South Carolina Gamecocks

Awards
Honda Sports Award Softball:
Lori Stoll, Texas A&M Aggies

References